The Guban ('burnt' or 'burned') is the indigenous name for northwestern Somaliland.

See also

References

Hadden, Robert Lee. 2007. "The Geology of Somalia: A Selected Bibliography of Somalian Geology, Geography and Earth Science." Engineer Research and Development Laboratories, Topographic Engineering Center

Geography of Somaliland
Deserts of Africa